The Poble Espanyol (literally, Spanish town) is an open-air architectural museum in Barcelona, Catalonia, Spain, approximately 400 metres away from the Fountains of Montjuïc. Built for the 1929 Barcelona International Exposition, the museum consists of 117 full-scale buildings replicated from different places in the Iberian Peninsula, joined forming a small town recreating urban atmospheres of disparate places in Spain. It also contains a theater, restaurants, artisan workshops and a museum of contemporary art.

History 
The museum was built for the 1929 Barcelona International Exposition as an exhibit of the architecture and townscapes found in different places of the Iberian Peninsula, mostly from Spain.

The four professionals visited over 600,000 sites to collect examples in an attempt to synthesize characteristics that might be attributed to the Iberian Peninsula. In reality, though, this sort of patched-up ensemble is proof of the wide variety, and therefore the utmost impossibility, to fulfill its claim to be a ‘Spanish’ Town, because there is not a unified style or solid common treats shared among the different cultures that form Spain.

References

External links

 Poble Espanyol Official Site
 El Poble Espanyol de Barcelona (German)

Museums in Barcelona
Sants-Montjuïc
Open-air museums in Spain
Historic house museums in Spain
Shopping districts and streets in Catalonia
World's fair architecture in Barcelona
1929 Barcelona International Exposition